BAFTA in Scotland is the Scottish branch of the British Academy of Film and Television Arts. Formed in 1986, the branch holds two annual awards ceremonies recognising the achievement by performers and production staff in Scottish film, television and video games. These Awards are separate from the British Academy Television Awards and British Academy Film Awards.

Every year, BAFTA Scotland elects a committee to oversee the constitution and functionality of the organisation.

British Academy Scotland Awards

The British Academy Scotland Awards are presented in an annual award show hosted by BAFTA Scotland. From 2011 to 2018, the ceremony has taken place in the Radisson Blu Hotel in Glasgow. As of 2019, the ceremony has been hosted at the Doubletree by Hilton Glasgow Central. The 2018 British Academy Scotland Awards took place on 4 November 2018.

British Academy Scotland New Talent Awards

The British Academy Scotland New Talent Awards are presented in an annual award show hosted by BAFTA Scotland. The accolades honour the best upcoming talent in the field of film and television in Scotland. The 2016 British Academy Scotland New Talent Awards ceremony took place on 14 April 2016.

References

External links
 BAFTA in Scotland
 BAFTA

1986 establishments in Scotland
Television in Scotland
Cinema of Scotland
Scotland
Cultural organisations based in Scotland
Organizations established in 1986
Scottish awards